Benjamin Britten's Violin Concerto, Op. 15, was written from 1938 to 1939 and dedicated to Henry Boys, his former teacher at the Royal College of Music. It was premiered in New York on 29 March 1940 by the Spanish violinist Antonio Brosa with the New York Philharmonic conducted by John Barbirolli. A revised version of the concerto appeared in 1951, including alterations of the solo violin part prepared with the assistance of Manoug Parikian. It was performed by Bronislav Gimpel and the Royal Philharmonic Orchestra under Thomas Beecham.

Instrumentation
The concerto is scored for solo violin and an orchestra of three flutes (second and third flutes doubling piccolo), two oboes (second oboe doubling cor anglais), two clarinets, two bassoons, four horns, three trumpets, three trombones, tuba, timpani, percussion (glockenspiel, cymbals, triangle, bass drum, side drum, tenor drum), harp and strings.

Structure
The concerto is written in three movements:

 Moderato con moto – Agitato – Tempo primo
 Vivace – Animando – Largamente – Cadenza
 Passacaglia: Andante lento (Un poco meno mosso)

This form, although in three movements, is highly unlike that of concertos from the Classical and Romantic eras. First used in the First Violin Concerto of Sergei Prokofiev, this design is also evident in the concertos of William Walton and later in Shostakovich's first violin concerto, that has a structure that clearly recalls Britten's concerto.

Analysis
The work opens with a series of timpani strokes, a reminder perhaps of Beethoven's 1806 Violin Concerto. The rhythm is taken up by the bassoon and other instruments, persisting as an ostinato throughout the entire work. The violin enters with a song-like lament, soaring above the orchestra. The music is soon interrupted by a more militaristic and percussive secondary theme.

The ensuing second movement, cast as a wild, moto perpetuo scherzo, unmistakably recalls Prokofiev. The movement culminates in an impressive cadenza which, while recalling musical material from both the first and second movements, acts as an organic link straight into the finale.

As the finale, Britten uses a passacaglia: a set of variations on a ground bass, in the tradition of the Baroque chaconnes by Purcell and Bach. The ground bass, tonally unstable, is initially introduced by the trombone, as the violin recalls its lyrical theme from the first movement. Individual variations unfold, taking up characters of song, dance, capriccio and march. By the end, the ground bass is reduced to chant-like reminiscences; the orchestra leaves hints of an unmistakable D major chord, while the soloist is left undecided in a trill between the notes F-natural and G-flat.

Discography

References

External links
 , Janine Jansen, Berlin Philharmonic, Daniel Harding conducting

Concertos by Benjamin Britten
Britten
Music with dedications
1939 compositions
1958 compositions